An Olympic Park is a sports campus for hosting the Olympic Games. Typically it contains the Olympic Stadium and the International Broadcast Centre. It may also contain the Olympic Village or some of the other sports venues, such as the aquatics complex in the case of the summer games, or the main ice hockey rink for the winter games.  The Olympic Park is often part of the "legacy" which provides benefit to the host city after the games have ended. As such it may subsequently include an urban park and a museum or similar commemoration of the games that were hosted there.
 
The 1908 Olympic organising committee specified "As far as possible all the competitions, including swimming, archery, fencing, wrestling, etc., will be held on the same site in which the amphitheatre for the track-athletics and cycling will be erected." Not every games has a centralised complex of this type. The 1992 and 2010 Winter Games had widely dispersed venues; "Whistler Olympic Park" was the venue for the nordic skiing events in 2010. Venues of the 2016 Summer Olympics in Rio de Janeiro were split among four "clusters" rather than concentrated in a single Park.

List

References